Henry Willis Patrick "Bill" Norman (July 16, 1910 – April 21, 1962) was an American outfielder, coach, manager and scout in Major League Baseball. A longtime minor league player and manager, he is best remembered for his brief term as pilot of the Detroit Tigers in 1958–59.

Playing career
Norman was born in St. Louis, Missouri, and served as a bat boy for the St. Louis Browns as a 12-year-old. He attended St. Louis University and signed his first professional baseball contract in 1929. Only 20 years old, he was called up to the Chicago White Sox in 1931 after hitting .366 in the Class C Western Association. But he got into only 37 games with the 1931–32 White Sox, batted only .204 in 103 at bats, and would spend the rest of his playing career in the minors, where he batted .303 with 292 home runs in 2,092 games. Norman led the Class A1 Texas League in runs batted in (1941), and the top-level American Association in home runs (1942).

Managing career
In June 1946, he became manager of the Toronto Maple Leafs of the International League, then spent five seasons as a manager in the Cleveland Indians farm system, winning consecutive Eastern League pennants with the Wilkes-Barre Barons in 1950–51.

Norman then served as a coach for his hometown Browns for two seasons (1952–53) — the Browns' last in St. Louis before moving to Baltimore. In 1954, he joined the Tigers' organization as a scout and minor league manager, and rose to the Triple-A level as skipper of the Charleston Senators of the American Association in 1957. The following season, the Tigers — struggling at 21–28 under Jack Tighe on June 10 — promoted Norman to manager. He led them to 56 victories in 105 games and a fifth-place finish. But during the 1950s, the Tigers were undergoing a period of transition in their ownership and front office and in rebuilding mode on the field. They began 1959 with one of the worst starts in their history, losing 15 of their first 17 games. Norman could not survive the catastrophic streak; he was fired in favor of Jimmie Dykes on May 3. As a Major League manager, he won 58 games and lost 64 (.475).

Norman then rejoined his first MLB team, the White Sox, as a scout. In 1961 he returned to the minor leagues when he was named manager of the Chisox' Triple-A affiliate, the San Diego Padres of the Pacific Coast League, on July 12. It was his last year in baseball. After he returned to his job as a White Sox scout, Norman died from a heart attack at the outset of the 1962 season, in Milwaukee, Wisconsin, at the age of 51.

References

External links

Managing record
Biography in Borchertfield.com

1910 births
1962 deaths
Baseball coaches from Missouri
Baseball players from St. Louis
Chicago White Sox players
Chicago White Sox scouts
Dallas Steers players
Detroit Tigers managers
Detroit Tigers scouts
Elmira Pioneers players
Hollywood Stars players
Houston Buffaloes players
Knoxville Smokies players
Laurel Cardinals players
Louisville Colonels (minor league) players
Major League Baseball outfielders
Milwaukee Brewers (minor league) players
Montreal Royals players
Muskogee Chiefs players
Oklahoma City Indians players
St. Louis Browns coaches
St. Paul Saints (AA) players
San Antonio Missions managers
Shawnee Robins players
Syracuse Chiefs players
Toronto Maple Leafs (International League) managers
Toronto Maple Leafs (International League) players